Feyzabad (also Romanized as Feyẕābād, Feyzābād, and Faizābād; also known as Feiz Abad Pishkooh and Feyzābād-e Pīshkūh) is a village in Pishkuh Rural District, in the Central District of Taft County, Yazd Province, Iran. At the 2006 census, its population was 232, in 61 families.

References 

Populated places in Taft County